= 2018 Corpus Christi mayoral election =

Corpus Christi mayoral election, 2018
- November 6, 2018 (first round); December 18, 2018 (runoff)

Candidate	Joe McComb	Michael Hall
Party	Nonpartisan	Nonpartisan
Alliance	Republican
First-round vote	36,152	14,279
First-round percentage	49.71%	19.63%
Second-round vote	10,992	7,336
Second-round percentage	59.97%	40.03%
Candidate	Aislynn Campbell	Ray Madrigal De Pancho Villa
Party	Nonpartisan	Nonpartisan
First-round vote	13,235	6,264
First-round percentage	18.20%	8.61%
Mayor before election
Joe McComb
Republican
Elected mayor
Joe McComb
Republican

The 2018 Corpus Christi mayoral election was held on November 6, 2018, and December 18, 2018, to elect the mayor of Corpus Christi, Texas. The general election, held on November 6, 2018, did not produce a winner (elections for the mayoralty of Corpus Christi require a majority); therefore, a runoff was required and held on December 18, 2018. The runoff election resulted in the re-election of Joe McComb, this time for a full two-year term.

== Results ==
=== First round ===
First round results
Candidate	Votes	%
Joe McComb	36,152	49.71
Michael Hall	14,279	19.63
Aislynn Campbell	13,235	18.20
Ray Madrigal De Pancho Villa	6,264	8.61
Dan McQueen	2,800	3.85
Total votes	72,730	

=== Runoff ===
Runoff results
Candidate	Votes	%
Joe McComb	10,992	59.97
Michael Hall	7,336	40.03
Total votes	18,328	
